Ruto, or Rutto, is a surname of Kenyan origin. Notable people with the surname include:

Christopher Ruto, Anglican bishop in Kenya
Cyrus Rutto (born 1992), Kenyan long distance runner
David Ruto (born 1980), Keyan long distance runner
Emily Ruto (1989–2014), Kenyan cricketer
Evans Rutto (born 1979), Kenyan marathon runner and two-time winner of the Chicago Marathon
Isaac Ruto, Kenyan politician for the United Republican Party
Paul Ruto (born 1960), Kenyan middle-distance runner and 1993 world champion
Rachel Ruto (born 1968), Kenyan educator, first lady of Kenya
Ronald Kipchumba Rutto (born 1987), Kenyan steeplechase and marathon runner
William Ruto (born 1967), Kenyan politician, President of Kenya since 2022

See also
 Kalenjin name
Kipruto, related name meaning "son of Ruto"

Kalenjin names
Surnames of Kenyan origin